Dominique Potier (born 17 March 1954) is a French Socialist politician who has represented Meurthe-et-Moselle's 5th constituency in the National Assembly of France since 2012.

Potier was re-elected in the 2022 French legislative election.

References

External links 
 Official website
 National Assembly biography

Living people
1964 births
21st-century French politicians
Deputies of the 14th National Assembly of the French Fifth Republic
Deputies of the 15th National Assembly of the French Fifth Republic
Socialist Party (France) politicians
People from Toul
People from Meurthe-et-Moselle
Deputies of the 16th National Assembly of the French Fifth Republic
Members of Parliament for Meurthe-et-Moselle